The 1918 Mid Norfolk by-election was held on 23 October 1918. The by-election was held due to the death of the incumbent Liberal Unionist MP, William Lewis Boyle. It was won by the Conservative candidate Neville Jodrell, who was unopposed due to a War-time electoral truce.

References

1918 in England
1918 elections in the United Kingdom
By-elections to the Parliament of the United Kingdom in Norfolk constituencies
Unopposed by-elections to the Parliament of the United Kingdom (need citation)
20th century in Norfolk